The Andaman flowerpecker (Dicaeum virescens) is a species of bird in the family Dicaeidae.
It is endemic to the Andaman Islands.

Behaviour and ecology
Its natural habitat is subtropical or tropical moist lowland forest.

References

Rasmussen, P.C., and J.C. Anderton. 2005. Birds of South Asia. The Ripley guide. Volume 2: attributes and status. Smithsonian Institution and Lynx Edicions, Washington D.C. and Barcelona.

Andaman flowerpecker
Birds of the Andaman Islands
Andaman flowerpecker
Endemic birds of India